Acteon isabella is a species of sea snail, a marine gastropod mollusk in the family Acteonidae.

Original Description
    Poppe G.T., Tagaro S.P. & Goto Y. (2018). New marine species from the Central Philippines. Visaya. 5(1): 91-135. page(s): 112, pl. 13 figs 1–3.

References

External links
 Worms Link

Acteonidae
Gastropods described in 2018